The 1983–84 Coupe de France was the 67th Coupe de France, France's annual national football cup competition. It was won by FC Metz, who defeated AS Monaco FC in the final.

Round of 16

Quarter-finals

Semi-finals
First round

Second round

Final

References

French federation

1983–84 domestic association football cups
1983–84 in French football
1983-84